Andrei or Andrey Ivanov may refer to:

Footballers
Andrei Ivanov (footballer born 1967), Soviet footballer
Andrei Ivanov (footballer born 1972), Russian footballer
Andrei Ivanov (footballer born 1988), Russian U-21 footballer
Andrei Ivanov (footballer, born 1994), Russian footballer
Andrei Ivanov (Bulgarian footballer), Bulgarian footballer, Vladislav Varna

Others
Andrei Ivanov (ice hockey) (born 1981), Russian ice hockey player
Andrei Ivanov (basketball) (born 1984), Russian basketball player in the Russia national basketball team
Andrey Ivanov (swimmer) (born 1976), Russian swimmer
Andrei Ivanov (singer), Russian singer in War and Peace (opera)
Andrey Ivanov (skier) (born 1973), Russian Olympic skier
Andrei Ivanov (writer) (born 1971), Estonian-Russian writer
Andrey Ivanovich Ivanov (1775-1848), Russian painter
Nader Sufyan Abbas, Qatari-Bulgarian weightlifter, born as Andrey Ivanov